Kirilenko is a Russian surname of Ukrainian descent derived from the name of Cyril.  Notable people with this name include:

 Andrei Kirilenko (born 1981), Russian basketball player who played in the National Basketball Association
 Andrei Kirilenko (politician) (1906–1990), Soviet politician
 Artur Kirilenko (born 1972), Russian and European real estate developer
 Denis Kirilenko (born 1984), Russian footballer
 Maria Kirilenko (born 1987), Russian tennis player

See also
 
 

Russian-language surnames